Sunny Besen Thrasher (born December 13, 1976) is a Canadian former child actor who starred as Paul Edison in Nelvana's live-action series The Edison Twins, and supplied voices in the first two Care Bears movies. He's the son of Prairie Oyster keyboardist and Canadian songwriter Joan Besen.

He also played Max in both the film and TV series of My Pet Monster and voiced Reggie Mantle in The New Archies as well as several characters in the Care Bears television show, Garbage Pail Kids, Ultraforce and Babar.

Sunny has also guest appeared in several television shows such as Katts and Dog, Alfred Hitchcock Presents and Maniac Mansion.

His play "The Takeover Clause" was produced by Open Mind Productions and directed by Todd Vercoe in Toronto at the Annex Theatre.

Filmography

External links

1976 births
Living people
Canadian male television actors
Canadian male voice actors
Canadian male child actors
Male actors from Toronto